Indira Gandhi National Centre for the Arts (IGNCA), New Delhi is a premier government-funded arts organization in India. It is an autonomous institute under the Union Ministry of Culture.

History 
The Indira Gandhi National centre for arts was launched on 19 November, 1985 by Prime Minister Rajiv Gandhi. The elements - fire, water, earth, sky and vegetation - were brought together. Five rocks from five major rivers - Sindhu (Indus), Ganga, Kaveri, Mahanadi and the Narmada (where the most ancient ammonite fossils are found) were composed into sculptural forms. These remain at the site as reminders of the antiquity of Indian culture and the sacredness of her rivers and rocks.

The Indira Gandhi National Centre for the Arts Trust was constituted and registered at New Delhi on 24 March 1987.

 Board of Trustees
 Executive Committee

About

The Indira Gandhi National Centre for the Arts, is visualised as a centre encompassing the study and experience of all the arts – each form with its own integrity, yet within a dimension of mutual interdependence, interrelated with nature, social structure and cosmology.

This view of the arts, integrated with, and essential to the larger matrix of human culture, is predicated upon the role of the arts as essential to the integral quality of person, at home with himself and society. It partakes of the holistic worldview so powerfully articulated throughout Indian tradition, and emphasized by modern Indian leaders from Mahatma Gandhi to Rabindranath Tagore.

The arts are here understood to comprise the fields of creative and critical literature, written and oral; the visual arts, ranging from architecture, sculpture, painting and graphics to general material culture, photography and film; the performing arts of music, dance and theatre in their broadest connotation; and all else in fairs, festivals and lifestyle that has an artistic dimension. In its initial stages the centre will focus attention on India; it will later expand its horizons to other civilizations and cultures. Through diverse programmes of research, publication, training, creative activities and performance, the IGNCA seeks to place the arts within the context of the natural and human environment. The fundamental approach of the centre is all its work will be both multidisciplinary and interdisciplinary.

Recognising the need to encompass and preserve the distributed fragments of Indian art and culture, a pioneering attempt has been made by Indira Gandhi National Centre for the Arts (IGNCA) to serve as a major resource centre for the arts, especially written, oral and visual materials. One of the programmes of this centre, in collaboration with UNDP, is to utilise multimedia computer technology to create a wide variety of software packages that communicate cultural information. Multimedia technology allows the user to interact and explore the subject in a non-linear mode by combining audio, text, graphics, animation and video on a computer.

Aims and Objectives

to serve as a major resource centre for Indian arts, especially written, oral and visual source materials
to conduct research on the arts and humanities, and to publish reference works, glossaries, dictionaries and encyclopedia
to establish a tribal and folk arts division with a core collection for conducting systematic scientific studies and live presentations
to provide a forum for dialogue through performances, exhibitions, multi-media projections, conferences, seminars and workshops on traditional and contemporary Indian arts
to foster dialogue between the arts and current ideas in philosophy, science and technology, with a view toward bridging the gap in intellectual understanding between modern sciences and arts and culture
to evolve models of research programmes and arts administration pertinent to the Indian ethos
to elucidate the formative and dynamic factors in the complex web of interactions between diverse social strata, communities and regions
to interact with other national and international institutions
to conduct related research in the arts, humanities and culture

Divisions

 Kalanidhi – (कलानिधि) KalaNidhi is a repository of research and reference material in Humanities and the Arts. It has built a massive collection of source material, encapsulating the entire spectrum of textual, visual and auditory data. Within the Indira Gandhi National Centre for Arts (IGNCA).
 Kalakosa - (कलाकोश) Kālakośa is the research and publication division, investigating the intellectual traditions in their dimensions of multi-layers and multi-disciplines
 Janapada Sampada - (जनपद     संपदा) Janapada Sampadā, is the division engaged in lifestyle studies. It has a programmatic character classified as Lifestyle Studies, Multi-media Presentation, Events, and Children's World, each with a number of subprograms.
 Kaladarsana - Kalādarśana (कलादर्शन) is the executive unit that transforms researches and     studies emanating from the IGNCA into visible forms through exhibitions.      
 Cultural Informatics - कल्चरल इन्फॉर्मेटिक्स (सीआईएल)     – एक मल्टीमीडिया शोध     केन्द्र Cultural Informatics     Laboratory where there are applied technology tools for cultural preservation     and propagation. Among its projects it is Kalāsampadā (कलासंपदा), a digital repository of content and information     integrated with a user-friendly interface, for encompassing and preserving     the rare archival collections of the IGNCA.    
 Sutradhara - (सूत्राधार) Sutrādhāra is the administrative section, supporting     and coordinating all the activities. The Member Secretary is the Executive     head of both academic and administrative divisions. It comprises     Administration, Finance, Accounts, Services & Supplies and     International Dialogue Unit.  
 Media Centre – (मीडिया सेंटर) Since the inception of IGNCA, it was envisioned that     the centre would develop into a huge digital repository in future. Media     Centre has been endeavouring to do audio/visual research documentation and     archiving them for prosperity and implementing worldwide dissemination as     well.      
 Adi Drishya – (आदि-दृश्य ) The Indira Gandhi National Centre for the Arts     (IGNCA) has conceived a major academic programme, which relates to     exploring artistic manifestations emanating from man's primary sense     perceptions. Amongst the senses that lead to aesthetic experience are     vision (Drishya) and hearing (Shravya). The rock art forms a crucial     component of the Adi Drishya programme.      
 Conservation Lab. – (संरक्षण प्रयोगशाला ) Conservation Lab specializes in the areas of     preventive conservation, conservation training, conservation of books,     manuscripts, paintings, and objects (metals, wooden objects, ethnographic     objects, etc.). Conservation Division also undertakes research and     documentation projects in the field of cast iron objects and rust     converters.     
 Academic – (पीजी डिप्‍लोमा     पाठ्यक्रम) Ministry     of Culture, Government of India set up IGNCA in the year 1987 to explore,     study and disseminate Indian arts, revive the dialogue between India and     her neighbours, especially in South and Southeast Asia, in the areas     pertaining to the arts. Arts encompasses a wide area of studies, such as     creative literature – written and oral; visual arts – architecture,     sculpture, painting, graphics and general material culture; photography     and films; the performing arts – music, dance and theatre; festivals with     artistic dimension 
 Photo Unit – (फोटो यूनिट )The Photography Unit undertake photo-documentation of     various Objects of Cultural Archives, Preparing Preservation copies and     Copy Negatives of Photo collections, Regular activities of IGNCA, such as     Seminars, Lectures, Workshops, Visits of      Dignitaries, Documentation of      Exhibitions as and when required also Preparation of Slides for     various Divisions for publication purposes and for Lecture Series by     Scholars.

Regional centres

 Varanasi    
 Guwahati    
 Bengaluru     
 Ranchi     
 Puducherry    
 Thrissur
 Goa 
 Vadodara     
 Srinagar

References
2.https://ignca.gov.in/

External links
Official website

Arts councils
Arts organisations based in Delhi
Government buildings in Delhi
Ministry of Culture (India)
National Centre for the Arts
Arts organizations established in 1985
1985 establishments in Delhi